This is a list of commercial banks in Malawi.

 CDH Investment Bank
 Ecobank Malawi
 FDH Bank
 First Capital Bank Malawi Limited
 National Bank of Malawi
 NBS Bank
 Standard Bank Malawi
 MyBucks Malawi

External links
 Website of Reserve Bank of Malawi

See also
 List of banks in Africa
 Reserve Bank of Malawi
 Economy of Malawi
 List of companies based in Malawi

References

 
Banks
Malawi
Malawi